The 2011–12 FAI Umbro Intermediate Cup was the 85th season of the tournament's existence. 94 clubs competed to win the title, and it was Avondale United who were the victors after they beat Cherry Orchard 2–1 for the second successive season in the final after extra time in Tallaght Stadium to gain their fifth Intermediate Cup title. The 16 teams that reached the fourth round qualified for the 2012 FAI Cup.

First round
Intermediate teams from the Leinster Senior League, Munster Senior League and Ulster Senior League enter at this stage. In this round teams from the Leinster Senior League play each other, teams from the Munster Senior League play each other, and teams from the Ulster Senior League play each other. The draw was made on 16 September 2011 with ties to be played on the weekend of 9 October 2011.

Ulster

Byes
Bonagee United
Fanad United
Letterkenny Rovers

Munster

Byes
 Ballincollig A.F.C.
 Ballinhassig A.F.C.
  Carrigaline United A.F.C.
 Cobh Wanderers
 Crofton Celtic F.C.
 Douglas Hall A.F.C.
 Fermoy A.F.C.
 Glasheen F.C.
 Leeds A.F.C. 
 Mallow United
 Ringmahon Rangers F.C.
 St. Mary's
 Temple United F.C.
 Tramore Athletic
 Youghal United F.C.

Leinster

Byes
Ballyfermot United
Bangor Celtic
Crumlin United
Edenderry Town
Glenmore Dundrum
Greystones
Leixlip United
Newbridge Town
Peamount Moyle Park
Postal United
Rathcoole Boys
St. Mochta's
St. Patrick's C.Y.
Skerries Town
UCD Reserves
Wayside Celtic

Second round
The draw was made on 12 October 2011 with ties to be played on the weekend of 30 October 2011. In this round teams from the Leinster Senior League play each other, teams from the Munster Senior League play each other, and teams from the Ulster Senior League play each other.

Ulster

Munster

Leinster

Third round
The draw was made on 2 November 2011 with ties to be played on the weekend of 4 December 2011. In this round teams from the Leinster Senior League, Munster Senior League, Ulster Senior League play each other. The 16 winners of the Third Round ties will progress to the Fourth Round and also qualify for the 2012 FAI Cup.

Fourth round
The draw was made on 6 December 2011 at FAI Headquarters, Abbotstown by the FAI Domestic Committee. Ties are to be played on the weekend of 29 January 2012.

Quarter-final
The draw was made on 7 February 2012 at FAI Headquarters, Abbotstown by the FAI Domestic Committee. Ties will be played on the weekend of 4 March 2012.

Semi-final
The draw was made on 6 February 2012 at the FAI Headquarters, Abbotstown, by FAI President Paddy McCaul and former Drogheda United, Shamrock Rovers, Derry City and Shelbourne star Mick Neville. Ties will be played on the weekend of 8 April 2012.

Final

References

Ireland
5
5
2011